Pennsylvania's 17th congressional district is located in southwestern Pennsylvania, which includes the entirety of Beaver County and the northwestern parts of Allegheny County not part of the 12th district. It has been represented since January 3, 2023 by Democrat Chris Deluzio.

In January 2018, the Supreme Court of Pennsylvania ruled that the 2011 map violated the state constitution and redrew it on February 18, 2018. What was the 17th district, which had been anchored in Northeast Pennsylvania, was modified to become the 9th district, and the old 12th district likewise became the 17th, for the 2018 elections and representation thereafter until the current map was ordered on February 23, 2022. In the 2020 redistricting cycle, its portion of Butler County, including Cranberry Township, was removed from the district, while it gained some eastern suburbs of Pittsburgh, such as Forest Hills and Wilkinsburg.

Election results from recent presidential races

List of members representing the district 
Because congressional districts are reconfigured and renumbered every 10 years (and occasionally at other times), the following chart displays each time Pennsylvania's districts were changed.

Recent election results

2012

2014

2016

2018

2020

2022

Counties and municipalities within the district 2005–2013

Berks County: Townships of Alsace, Bern (Districts 1 and 2), Bethel, Centre, Earl (District 1), Greenwich, Heidelberg, Jefferson, Maidencreek, Marion, Muhlenberg (Districts 2, 3, 5, 7 and 8), North Heidelberg, Oley, Ontelaunee, Penn, Perry, Pike, Richmond, Rockland, Ruscombmanor, Tilden, Tulpehocken, Upper Bern, Upper Tulpehocken, and Windsor; Boroughs of Bernville, Centerport, Fleetwood, Hamburg, Laureldale, Leesport, Lenhartsville, Lyons, Robesonia, Shoemakersville, Strausstown, and Womelsdorf.

Dauphin County: all

Lebanon County: all

Perry County: Townships of Buffalo, Centre, Juniata, Miller, Oliver (all blocks except 6999 of tract 030200), Penn, Spring, Tuscarora, Watts, and Wheatfield; Boroughs of Bloomfield, Duncannon, New Buffalo, and Newport (District 1)

Schuylkill County: all

See also
List of United States congressional districts
Pennsylvania's congressional districts

References
Notes

Bibliography

 Congressional Biographical Directory of the United States 1774–present

External links
 Congressional redistricting in Pennsylvania
 Daily Kos election results by Congressional District

17
Constituencies established in 1823
1823 establishments in Pennsylvania